The Rockdale News is a newspaper serving Conyers, Georgia, and surrounding Rockdale County. The newspaper publishes once per week on Saturdays.

History
The newspaper was first published on April 4, 2009, under editor Tisa Smart Washington. On May 22, 2009, Michelle Kim took over as the paper's editor. The Rockdale News previously reached 10,500 homes through free and paid distribution. The paper was a tall tab format and featured color on every page. Content was completely local with no use of wire. The newspaper was owned by Morris Multimedia of Savannah, Georgia.

The Rockdale News shut its doors and printed its last edition on Saturday, September 26, 2015.

Subscribers received a letter offering a choice of a refund on any unused portion of their subscription payment or donating that portion to a charity.

http://www.covnews.com/m/archives/92744/

References
The Rockdale News
Conyers/Rockdale Chamber

Mass media in Atlanta
Newspapers published in Georgia (U.S. state)